Lumbrineris is a genus of polychaetes belonging to the family Lumbrineridae.

The genus has cosmopolitan distribution.

Species:

Lumbrineris aberrans 
Lumbrineris abyssalis 
Lumbrineris abyssicola 
Lumbrineris acutiformis 
Lumbrineris acutifrons 
Lumbrineris adriatica 
Lumbrineris africana 
Lumbrineris albifrons 
Lumbrineris amboinensis 
Lumbrineris aniara 
Lumbrineris annulata 
Lumbrineris aphanophthalmus 
Lumbrineris araukensis 
Lumbrineris ater 
Lumbrineris bassi 
Lumbrineris bidens 
Lumbrineris bifilaris 
Lumbrineris bifurcata 
Lumbrineris bilabiata 
Lumbrineris bipapillifera 
Lumbrineris bistriata 
Lumbrineris biuncinata 
Lumbrineris brasiliensis 
Lumbrineris caledonica 
Lumbrineris californiensis 
Lumbrineris carpinei 
Lumbrineris caudaensis 
Lumbrineris cavifrons 
Lumbrineris cedroensis 
Lumbrineris cervicalis 
Lumbrineris chilensis 
Lumbrineris cingulata 
Lumbrineris cluthensis 
Lumbrineris coccinea 
Lumbrineris composita 
Lumbrineris contorta 
Lumbrineris crassicephala 
Lumbrineris crassidentata 
Lumbrineris crosnieri 
Lumbrineris crosslandi 
Lumbrineris cruzensis 
Lumbrineris debilis 
Lumbrineris dentata 
Lumbrineris descendens 
Lumbrineris duebeni 
Lumbrineris ebranchiata 
Lumbrineris ehlersii 
Lumbrineris erecta 
Lumbrineris ernesti 
Lumbrineris eugeniae 
Lumbrineris ezoensis 
Lumbrineris fauchaldi 
Lumbrineris fossilis 
Lumbrineris frauenfeldi 
Lumbrineris futilis 
Lumbrineris geldiayi 
Lumbrineris grandis 
Lumbrineris gulielmi 
Lumbrineris hartmani 
Lumbrineris hemprichii 
Lumbrineris heterochaeta 
Lumbrineris higuchiae 
Lumbrineris homodentata 
Lumbrineris humilis 
Lumbrineris imajimai 
Lumbrineris index 
Lumbrineris indica 
Lumbrineris inflata 
Lumbrineris inhacae 
Lumbrineris inhacae 
Lumbrineris janeirensis 
Lumbrineris januarii 
Lumbrineris japonica 
Lumbrineris kerguelensis 
Lumbrineris knipovichana 
Lumbrineris knoxi 
Lumbrineris labrofimbriata 
Lumbrineris latreilli 
Lumbrineris levinseni 
Lumbrineris ligulata 
Lumbrineris limbata 
Lumbrineris limicola 
Lumbrineris lobata 
Lumbrineris longensis 
Lumbrineris longifolia 
Lumbrineris longipodiata 
Lumbrineris lucida 
Lumbrineris luciliae 
Lumbrineris lumbricalis 
Lumbrineris lusitanica 
Lumbrineris luti 
Lumbrineris macquariensis 
Lumbrineris maculata 
Lumbrineris magalhaensis 
Lumbrineris magnanuchalata 
Lumbrineris magnapalpa 
Lumbrineris malaysiae 
Lumbrineris mando 
Lumbrineris maxillosa 
Lumbrineris meteorana 
Lumbrineris minima 
Lumbrineris minuscula 
Lumbrineris minuta 
Lumbrineris mirabilis 
Lumbrineris mixochaeta 
Lumbrineris monroi 
Lumbrineris moorei 
Lumbrineris mustaquimi 
Lumbrineris nagae 
Lumbrineris neozealaniae 
Lumbrineris nishii 
Lumbrineris nonatoi 
Lumbrineris nuchalis 
Lumbrineris obscura 
Lumbrineris obtusa 
Lumbrineris oceanica 
Lumbrineris ocellata 
Lumbrineris oculata 
Lumbrineris orensanzi 
Lumbrineris oxychaeta 
Lumbrineris pallida 
Lumbrineris papillifera 
Lumbrineris parvapedata 
Lumbrineris patagonica 
Lumbrineris paucidentata 
Lumbrineris pectinifera 
Lumbrineris penascensis 
Lumbrineris perkinsi 
Lumbrineris pinaster 
Lumbrineris platylobata 
Lumbrineris platypygos 
Lumbrineris polydesma 
Lumbrineris pseudobifilaris 
Lumbrineris pseudopolydesma 
Lumbrineris pterignatha 
Lumbrineris quasibifilaris 
Lumbrineris quinquedentata 
Lumbrineris reunionensis 
Lumbrineris rovignensis 
Lumbrineris salazari 
Lumbrineris sarsi 
Lumbrineris scolopendrina 
Lumbrineris setosa 
Lumbrineris shiinoi 
Lumbrineris similabris 
Lumbrineris simplex 
Lumbrineris simplicis 
Lumbrineris sinensis 
Lumbrineris sphaerocephala 
Lumbrineris striata 
Lumbrineris testudinum 
Lumbrineris treadwelli 
Lumbrineris trigonocephala 
Lumbrineris uncinigera 
Lumbrineris vanhoeffeni 
Lumbrineris variegatus 
Lumbrineris versicolor 
Lumbrineris vincentis 
Lumbrineris virgini 
Lumbrineris zatsepini

References

Annelids